Gladiator Energy Drink is a lucha libre-themed line of energy drink sodas first released in México in 2008 by The Coca-Cola Company. This product is endorsed by lucha libre stars of Consejo Mundial de Lucha Libre like Místico, Perro Aguayo, Jr., Último Guerrero and Dr. Wagner, Jr. In July of the same year, Gladiator Energy Drink is released in Dominican Republic and in 2009 is released in Brazil.

This sparkling drink was first introduced in Ukraine in 2009; One year after, the production line for Gladiator added the 0,5-litre PET bottle.

Flavors

 Fruits
 Red Citrics
 Citrus Punch (only in Mexico)

External links
 Mexican Gladiator Energy Drink website
 Brazilian Gladiator Energy Drink website

Coca-Cola brands
Products introduced in 2008